Samuel or Sam Cox may refer to:

 Samuel Cox (minister) (1826–1893), English Baptist minister and Christian universalist
 Samuel Cox, Jr. (1847–1906), American politician
 Samuel Hanson Cox (1793–1880), American Presbyterian minister and abolitionist
 Samuel S. Cox (1824–1889), American congressman and diplomat
 Samuel P. Cox (1828–1913), Union Colonel in American Civil War; killed William T. Anderson
 Samuel D. Cox (born 1961), United States Air Force general
 Sam Cox (actor), British television and stage actor
 Sam Cox (rugby union) (born 1980), English rugby union players
 Sam Cox (footballer, born 1990), Guyanese footballer
 Sam Cox (footballer, born 1920) (1920–1985), English footballer
 Sammy Cox (1924–2015), Scottish footballer
 Sam Cox (Australian politician) (born 1964), Liberal National Party of Queensland politician

See also
Samuel Coxe, English MP